Maria Cristina of Naples and Sicily (Maria Cristina Amelia Teresa; 17 January 1779 – 11 March 1849) was a Princess of Naples and Sicily and later Queen of Sardinia as wife of King Charles Felix. She was a daughter of Ferdinand I of the Two Sicilies and Maria Carolina of Austria.

Princess of Naples and Sicily (1779–1807)

Maria Cristina was born on 17 January 1779 at the Caserta Palace in Caserta. She was the sixth child and fourth daughter of King Ferdinand I of the Two Sicilies and his wife Maria Carolina of Austria, a daughter of Empress Maria Theresa of Austria. She was her mother's favourite child.

Her twin sister Maria Cristina Amelia died of smallpox on 26 February 1783, at the age of four.

Duchess of Genoa (1807–1821)

Maria Cristina was married on 6 April 1807 in Palermo with Prince Charles Felix of Savoy, who became King of Sardinia when his elder brother Victor Emmanuel I abdicated in 1821. Until her husband became king, she was styled as the Duchess of Genoa.

Queen of Sardinia (1821–1831)

The royal couple were interested in the arts and artists, and turned the Royal House in Agliè and the Villa Rufinella in Frascati into comfortable residences. During her husband's reign, they lived at the Palazzo Chiablese, where her husband later died in 1831.

In 1825, the queen engaged the archaeologist Marquess Luigi Biondi (1776–1839), whose excavation work uncovered Tusculum, an excavation in which Maria Cristina financed. In 1839 and 1840, the architect and archaeologist Luigi Canina (1795–1856) was engaged by the royal family and excavated the Theatre area of Tusculum. The ancient works of art excavated were sent to the Duke of Savoy's Castle of Agliè in Piedmont.

Charles Felix died in 1831 after a reign of ten years. Maria Cristina lived the rest of her life in Turin, Naples, Agliè and Frascati, and died in Savona, Liguria. She was buried beside her husband in the Hautecombe Abbey, Saint-Pierre-de-Curtille. The couple had no children.

Ancestry

References

External links

|-

1779 births
1849 deaths
People from Caserta
Sardinian queens consort
Princesses of Savoy
House of Bourbon-Two Sicilies
Neapolitan princesses
Sicilian princesses
Italian twins
18th-century Italian people
19th-century Italian people
Italian Roman Catholics
Burials at Hautecombe Abbey
Daughters of kings